Ulukulevo (Olokül) is a rural locality (a village) and the administrative centre of Karlamansky Selsoviet, Karmaskalinsky District, Bashkortostan, Russia. The population was 4,546 as of 2010. There are 31 streets.

Geography 
Ulukulevo is located 16 km northeast of Karmaskaly (the district's administrative centre) by road. Karlaman is the nearest rural locality.

References 

Rural localities in Karmaskalinsky District